Lee Woong-Hee (born 18 July 1988) is a South Korean football defender.

Club career
Lee, a draftee from the 2011 K-League draft intake, was selected by Daejeon Citizen for the 2011 season.  His first appearance for Daejeon Citizen was in the club's first round match of the K-League Cup, against Incheon United.  The match ended with Daejeon losing 0 - 3, with Lee being substituted early in the second half.  His debut in the K-League was as a late substitute in Daejeon's match against Jeju United on 10 April 2011.

In January 2014 Lee moved from newly relegated Daejeon Citizen to FC Seoul.

Club career statistics

References

External links

1988 births
Living people
Association football defenders
South Korean footballers
K League 1 players
K League 2 players
Daejeon Hana Citizen FC players
FC Seoul players
Gimcheon Sangmu FC players